Jamal al-Din Yusuf bin al-Amir Sayf al-Din Taghribirdi, or Abū al-Maḥāsin Yūsuf ibn Taghrī-Birdī, or Ibn Taghribirdi (2 February 1411— 5 June 1470; 813–874 Hijri) was an Islamic historian born in the 15th century during the Mamluk rule. He studied under al-Ayni and al-Maqrizi, two of the leading Cairene historians and scholars of the day.  His most famous work is a multi-volume chronicle of Egypt and the Mamluk sultanate called al-Nujum al-zahira fi muluk Misr wa'l-Qahira.  His style is annalistic and gives precise dates for most events;  this format makes it clear that Ibn Taghribirdi had privileged access to the sultans and their records. The name "Taghribirdi" is cognate to modern Turkish "Tanrıverdi" and means god-given in Turkic languages.

Works
 Al-Nujūm al-Zāhirah fī Mulūk Miṣr wa-al-Qāhirah.  Chronicle of period from the Islamic conquest of Egypt in 641 to 1468.
Edited by William Popper. 12. vols. Cairo, Dār al-Kutub al-Miṣrīyah, 1929–56.
Miṣr al-Jadīdah, al-Qāhirah, al-Maktab al-ʻArabī lil-Maʻārif , 2017.
 al-Manhal al-ṣāfī wa-al-mustawfá baʻda al-wāfī; 13-vol. biographical dictionary with approx. 3000 entries celebrating the lives of sultans, princes (amirs), scholars  and scientists (ulama), dignitaries, and entertainers, from the Bahri dynasty and later.  
 Ḥawādith al-duhūr fī madá al-ayyām wa-al-shuhūr; Egypt history 1250–1517 continues al-Maqrizi's Suluk li-ma'rifat duwwal al-muluk.
 Al-Baḥr al-zākhir fī tārīkh al-ʻālam wa-akhbār al-awāʼil wa-al-awākhir; universal history from creation of Adam (National Library of Paris, No.1551); Iraq  MS purchased by Dar al-Kutub, Egypt.
 Mawrid al-laṭāfah fī man waliya al-salṭanah wa-al-khilāfah ; Biographies of the sultans and the caliphs.

Bibliography
 History of Egypt 1382–1469; transl. from the Arabic Annals of Abu l-Maḥāsin Ibn Taghrī Birdī by William Popper, Berkeley 1954–63.

See also
List of Muslim historians

External links
 Short summary of Ibn Taghribirdi's al-Nujum al-zahira fi muluk Misr wa'l-Qahira (Arabic)
 Read parts of al-Nujum al-zahira fi muluk Misr wa'l-Qahira (Arabic)

References 

1410 births
1470 deaths
15th-century biographers
15th-century Egyptian historians
15th-century Muslims
Encyclopedists of the medieval Islamic world
Historians from the Mamluk Sultanate